Iseh is a village in the Sideman district, Karangasem Regency, Bali, Indonesia. Walter Spies, Theo Meier and Theo Carp lived and worked in the area. The village is near mount Agung. The house Spies built amongst the volcanic landscape and terraced rice paddy fields remains.

References

Populated places in Bali